Janai Nelson is an American lawyer, who currently serves as the President and Director-Counsel of the NAACP Legal Defense Fund (LDF).

Career

Education 
Nelson earned her B.A. from New York University and her J.D. from UCLA School of Law.

LDF Lawyer (First Tenure) 
Nelson began her civil rights career at LDF, first as an extern in 1995 while a student at UCLA School of Law, then as a recipient of the prestigious Fried Frank-LDF Fellowship in 1998 until she was hired as an Assistant Counsel by LDF's first Female President and Director-Counsel Elaine Jones. Nelson went on to lead LDF's Political Participation Group, including the entire voting rights and redistricting docket, felony disenfranchisement, and voter suppression matters. 

During her initial tenure at LDF, her notable cases included Hayden v. Pataki, a challenge to New York’s felon disenfranchisement scheme in which she argued before the Second Circuit en banc and served as lead counsel. She was also on the team that represented African- and Haitian-American voters in NAACP v. Hood in a voter suppression challenge following the Bush v. Gore presidential election. She also served as counsel in a capital case before the Supreme Court of the United States, Banks v. Dretke. 

Nelson left LDF after being named a Fulbright Scholar to conduct research in Ghana, West Africa.

Teaching and scholarship 
Nelson spent nearly 10 years in academia, where she became a full professor and was the Associate Dean for Faculty Scholarship  and Associate Director of Ronald H. Brown Center for Civil Rights and Economic Development at St. John's University School of Law. While in the academy, Nelson was honored with the Derrick A. Bell Award from the American Association of Law Schools Section on Minority Groups and was named one of Lawyers of Color’s 50 Under 50 minority professors making an impact in legal education. Nelson taught classes on topics such as Election Law and Political Participation, Comparative Election Law, Voting Rights, Professional Responsibility, Constitutional Law. Nelson's scholarship focuses on domestic and comparative election law, race, and democratic theory, and her work has been published in numerous law journals and popular publications.

LDF Lawyer (Second Tenure) 
Nelson returned to LDF in 2014 as its Associate Director-Counsel, after being recruited by President and Director-Counsel Sherrilyn Ifill. A member of the litigation and policy teams, Nelson was lead counsel in Veasey v. Abbott (2018), a successful federal challenge to Texas’ discriminatory voter ID law, and was the lead architect of National Urban League, et al. v. Trump (2020), which sought to declare President Trump’s Executive Order banning diversity, equity, and inclusion training in the workplace unconstitutional before it was later rescinded by President Biden.

In 2021, Nelson represented Professor Nikole Hannah-Jones in a lawsuit against the University of North Carolina Board of Regents concerning its decision to deny and delay awarding her tenure when promoting her to the Knight Chair in Race and Investigative Reporting.

Nelson has also helped to steward some of LDF’s most pivotal developments in the past seven years, including launching the Marshall-Motley Scholars Program. The MMSP, named in honor of the nation’s first Black Supreme Court Justice and LDF founder Thurgood Marshall, and iconic civil rights litigator Constance Baker Motley, is a multi-year commitment to endow the South with committed, prepared civil rights lawyers trained to provide legal advocacy. Nelson also helped launch the Thurgood Marshall Institute.

Awards 
Nelson received the 2013 Derrick A. Bell Award from the Association of American Law Schools (AALS) Section on Minority Groups. That same year, she was also named one of Lawyers of Color's 50 Under 50 minority professors making an impact on legal education.

References 

21st-century American lawyers
American civil rights lawyers
Living people
NAACP activists
New York University alumni
St. John's University (New York City) faculty
UCLA School of Law alumni
Year of birth missing (living people)